Graham Cyril Rix (born 23 October 1957) is an English former professional football player who later became a coach and manager. He is the current manager of Fareham Town.

He played for Arsenal for thirteen years, then Brentford (on loan), Caen, Le Havre, Dundee and Chelsea. He also won 17 caps for England between 1980 and 1984.

Rix then managed Chelsea (as caretaker), Portsmouth, Oxford United,  Heart of Midlothian, Central and AFC Portchester.

In 1999, Rix was convicted of having underage sex with a 15-year-old girl, and sentenced to 12 months in prison, of which he served six. In 2018, he was accused of racism and physical assault by several former teenage Chelsea players. In 2022 the club made settlement payments to eight players who had made complaints.

Club career

Arsenal
Originally from Doncaster, Yorkshire, Rix joined Arsenal as an apprentice in 1974 and turned professional the year after. He made his debut for the club against Leicester City on 2 April 1977, and marked it by scoring the opening goal. Rix immediately became a regular on the left wing, replacing George Armstrong. Together with Liam Brady, he formed part of an impressive attacking midfield, which helped Arsenal to three successive FA Cup finals between 1978 and 1980. Arsenal only won one of these, in 1979 against Manchester United; the final score was 3–2, with Rix crossing for Alan Sunderland's last-minute winner, just one minute after United had equalised to level the score 2–2.

Arsenal reached the Cup Winners' Cup final the following season, against Valencia; the match finished 0–0 after extra time – a penalty shootout ensued, but Rix missed his kick and Arsenal lost. After the departure of Liam Brady to Juventus that summer, many believed Rix would also leave but he stayed at the club, and became captain in 1983. Arsenal's form slumped in the early 1980s, though, meaning Rix was unable to claim any silverware as skipper. Arsenal won the 1986-87 League Cup; Rix was not part of the squad for the final against Liverpool but he contributed three appearances en route.

A series of injuries to his achilles tendon kept Rix out of the team in the mid-1980s, and he lost his starting place in the side to Martin Hayes. Rix spent a spell on loan at Brentford, before being released in 1988. In all, he played 464 times for the Gunners, scoring 51 goals.

After Arsenal
After leaving the London club, Rix was the subject of offers from Sheffield Wednesday as well as Queens Park Rangers, but he instead signed for French club Caen, where he would spend three years before transferring to Le Havre, and then played in Scotland for Dundee before announcing his retirement as a player in 1993.

International career
Between 1980 and 1984, Rix played for the England national team, including making five appearances at the 1982 World Cup. He was capped 17 times, but failed to score. His first appearance came on 10 September 1980 in a 4–0 win over Norway, his last in a 1–0 win over Northern Ireland on 4 April 1984.

Coaching career

Chelsea
Rix joined Chelsea as youth team coach in mid-1993. During an injury crisis, he briefly enlisted as a player for the club, playing a solitary Premier League match in May 1995 against his old side Arsenal. Rix became assistant manager in 1996 under new Blues boss Ruud Gullit, and continued in the same role under Gullit's successor Gianluca Vialli, winning the FA Cup in 1997, and the League Cup and Cup Winners' Cup in 1998. He won the FA Cup again in 2000, before leaving the club, after a brief spell as caretaker manager following Vialli's sacking by Ken Bates.

Portsmouth and Oxford
Rix managed Portsmouth between 2001 and 2002, where his enthusiastic style of management started well, but tapered off in the middle of the 2001–02 season. A string of poor results, including a 4–1 home loss in the FA Cup to bottom of the Football League Leyton Orient, meant that Director of Football Harry Redknapp was given more responsibilities until he eventually replaced Rix as team manager toward the end of the season. Rix then managed Oxford United for seven months in 2004. Their form declined sharply during the last three months of the 2003–04 Division Three campaign: they fell from the automatic promotion places to ninth in the final table, failing to achieve a playoff place. He was sacked after their poor form continued into 2004–05, where he led the club nearer to the relegation zone than to the play-offs.

Hearts
In November 2005, after speculation linking him with the manager's job at Scottish Premier League club Heart of Midlothian, it was confirmed that Rix would take over at Tynecastle. He officially took the position of head coach on 8 November 2005. Events reported in February 2006, by Scottish newspapers, suggested that Rix was unhappy with Vladimir Romanov's "hands on" approach and speculation increased that Romanov was involved in team selection. On 22 March 2006 Rix was sacked as manager after just four months in charge, with the club citing poor results as the reason.

Central FC
On 13 August 2012, Rix was named the first manager of Central FC, which was a newly formed club founded by former Trinidad and Tobago international football player Brent Sancho, that competed in the TT Pro League. Rix recorded his first league win with Central FC on 19 October 2012 with a 1–0 win over Police. Rix and Central FC parted ways through mutual consent on 21 December 2012.

AFC Portchester
In February 2013, he was appointed head coach of AFC Portchester. He left the club in August 2017.

In August 2022, Rix took over as manager of Wessex Football League side Fareham Town.

Underage sex conviction
In March 1999, Rix was convicted of having underage sex with a 15-year-old girl, and sentenced to 12 months in prison, of which he served six. He was placed on the sex offender registry for ten years and banned by the FA from working with youth players under the age of 16. In 2013 he told The Independent that he thought she was of legal age. On his release from prison, he immediately returned to his old job. He subsequently claimed that there were "mitigating circumstances" in the case, saying "I know the true story that I've never ever said".

Racism and bullying allegations

In 2018, Rix, along with assistant manager Gwyn Williams, was accused of racism and physical assault by several Chelsea trainees who were of school age at the time. It was alleged that Rix had thrown a cup of hot coffee in the face of one player. Both denied the allegations. After a seven-month investigation, the police decided there was insufficient evidence to take any action. In February 2022, Chelsea agreed to make payments to several former players who had sued the club.

Personal life
Rix has a daughter from his first marriage with Gill. After getting divorced, he married his second wife, Linda. In April 2017, Rix suffered a heart attack.

Honours

Player
Arsenal
FA Cup: 1978–79

Managerial
AFC Porchester
Russell Cotes Cup: 2014
Sydenhams Wessex League Cup: 2015

References

External links

Rix's England statistics

1957 births
Living people
Footballers from Doncaster
English footballers
English expatriate footballers
England international footballers
England B international footballers
England under-21 international footballers
1982 FIFA World Cup players
Arsenal F.C. players
Brentford F.C. players
Chelsea F.C. players
Dundee F.C. players
Stade Malherbe Caen players
Expatriate footballers in France
Le Havre AC players
Premier League players
English football managers
Portsmouth F.C. managers
Oxford United F.C. managers
Heart of Midlothian F.C. managers
Chelsea F.C. non-playing staff
Central F.C. managers
A.F.C. Portchester managers
Premier League managers
Scottish Premier League managers
TT Pro League managers
English Football League players
Ligue 1 players
English people convicted of indecent assault
English people convicted of child sexual abuse
Association football midfielders
Sportspeople convicted of crimes
FA Cup Final players
Association football coaches
Fareham Town F.C. managers